Other Voices is a 2000 American thriller film written and directed by Dan McCormack and starring David Aaron Baker, Peter Gallagher, Mary McCormack, Rob Morrow and Campbell Scott.  It is McCormack’s directional debut.

At the 16th Independent Spirit Awards, Dan McCormack was nominated for the Someone to Watch Award for his work in the film.

Cast
Mary McCormack as Anna
David Aaron Baker as Phil
Campbell Scott as John
Rob Morrow as Jeff
Stockard Channing as Dr. Grover
Peter Gallagher as Jordin
Ricky Aiello as Mink

References

External links
 
 

American thriller films
2000 directorial debut films
2000 films
2000s English-language films
2000s American films